The Basil D'Oliveira Trophy is a trophy played for by England and South Africa in the sport of cricket. The trophy is awarded to the team that wins a Test series between the two nations. If the series is a draw, the holder keeps the trophy. It was first contested in the 2004–05 series played in South Africa.

The trophy is named after Basil D'Oliveira, a South African born English Test cricketer whose inclusion in the English squad to tour South Africa in 1968–69 led to the cancellation of the tour following objections from South African authorities due to D'Oliveira's classification as "coloured".

Background
Prior to the trophy's inception, England and South Africa had played twenty-nine series, sixteen in South Africa and thirteen in England. The overall record was seven South African victories, eighteen English victories, and four drawn series.

List of Test series

Pre Basil D'Oliveira Trophy era

Basil D'Oliveira Trophy era

References

England in international cricket
South Africa in international cricket
Test cricket competitions
Cricket awards and rankings